Krank may refer to:

"Krank" (song), a 2011 song by industrial rock band KMFDM
Krank Glacier, Antarctica
Krank Manufacturing Company building in St. Paul, Minnesota
Krank Park, Albany, New York 
Krank, the villain of the 1995 film The City of Lost Children
Luther and Nora Krank, the main characters of the 2004 film Christmas with the Kranks, played by Tim Allen and Jamie Lee Curtis

See also
Crank (disambiguation)